The Visis Cabá biosphere reserve is a  protected area  in the department of El Quiché.  It is also known as Biósfera Ixil, and is located in the North of the municipality of Chajul, on the communal lands of the Ixil communities.

The creation of the Visis Cabá biosphere reserve has gone through a long and complex process of negotiations between the Ixil communities, government institutions, and the communities of civil-war refugees (CPR) living in that area.

References

Biosphere reserves of Guatemala